Eamonn Walsh (born 20 September 1945) is a former Irish Labour Party politician. He was a Teachta Dála (TD) for Dublin South-West from 1992 to 1997.

Biography
A former art teacher, Walsh was elected to Dáil Éireann for Dublin South-West during the swing to Labour at the 1992 general election, after an unsuccessful attempt at the 1987 general election. Like some Labour Party TDs elected in 1992, he lost his seat at the 1997 general election. His seat was taken by Conor Lenihan of Fianna Fáil. Walsh unsuccessfully contested the Seanad Éireann election in the same year. He also failed to win a seat at the 2002 general election.

He was elected to Dublin County Council in 1991 for the Terenure area, and from 1999 to 2009 he was a local councillor for the Terenure-Rathfarnham area on South Dublin County Council.

References

1945 births
Councillors of Dublin County Council
Irish schoolteachers
Labour Party (Ireland) TDs
Living people
Local councillors in South Dublin (county)
Members of the 27th Dáil